Naale Ennundengil is a 1990 Indian Malayalam-language film,  directed by Sajan. The film stars Sukumaran, Silk Smitha, Captain Raju and Jagannatha Varma in the lead roles. The film has musical score by Shyam.

Cast 

Sukumaran
Silk Smitha
Captain Raju
Jagannatha Varma
Jagannathan
KPAC Sunny
Mohanraj
Nataraj
Rajesh
Sreenath
Suma Jayaram
Vishnuprakash
Y. G. Mahendran
 S.K.Sabapathy

Soundtrack 
The music was composed by Shyam and the lyrics were written by Chunakkara Ramankutty.

References

External links 
 

1990 films
1990s Malayalam-language films